Benjamin F. Gibson (July 13, 1931 – January 13, 2021) was a United States district judge of the United States District Court for the Western District of Michigan.

Education and career

Born in Safford, Alabama, Gibson was a private in the United States Army from 1948 to 1950. He received a Bachelor of Science degree from Wayne State University in 1955 and a Juris Doctor from Detroit College of Law (now the Michigan State University College of Law) in 1960. He was an assistant state attorney general of Michigan from 1961 to 1963. He was an assistant prosecutor for Ingham County, Michigan from 1963 to 1964. He was in private practice in Lansing, Michigan from 1964 to 1979, and was a professor at Western Michigan University Cooley Law School in Lansing from 1979 to 1980.

Federal judicial service

On July 12, 1979, Gibson was nominated by President Jimmy Carter to a new seat on the United States District Court for the Western District of Michigan created by 92 Stat. 1629. He was confirmed by the United States Senate on September 25, 1979, and received his commission on September 26, 1979. He served as Chief Judge from 1991 to 1995, assuming senior status on July 13, 1996. Gibson served in that capacity until his retirement from the bench on January 31, 1999.

See also 
 List of African-American federal judges
 List of African-American jurists

References

Sources
 

1931 births
2021 deaths
African-American judges
Judges of the United States District Court for the Western District of Michigan
United States district court judges appointed by Jimmy Carter
20th-century American judges
People from Dallas County, Alabama
Military personnel from Alabama
Wayne State University alumni
Detroit College of Law alumni
21st-century African-American people